Kälberberg is a constituent community of Buttenheim, in the district of Bamberg. It is in the Upper Franconian region of Bavaria, Germany. It is a small village with about 30 inhabitants.

Kälberberg is about 1000 meters west of Tiefenhöchstadt and is north of Hochstall.

History
The village was first mentioned in 1145; it had the name Calwenberg then.

Culture and Sightseeing
Just north of the village is the 142-meter-high :de:Sender Bamberg, a transmission tower owned by Deutsche Telekom AG that provides radio, television and telephone service. It was built in 1973.

A bell tower was built in the village in 1996.

External links
Bayerische Landesbibliothek Online - Kälberberg
Kälberberg on Google Maps

Bamberg (district)
Villages in Bavaria